Luis Muñoz Marín International Airport  is a joint civil-military international airport located in suburban Carolina, Puerto Rico,  southeast of San Juan. It is named for Luis Muñoz Marín, Puerto Rico's first democratically elected governor, and was known as Isla Verde International Airport (Aeropuerto Internacional de Isla Verde) until it was renamed in February 1985. It is the busiest airport in the Caribbean region by passenger traffic. Over 4 million passengers board a plane at the airport per year according to the Federal Aviation Administration, making it the 48th busiest airport overseen by said federal agency.

The airport is owned by the Puerto Rico Ports Authority and managed by Aerostar Airport Holdings, a public–private partnership which was awarded a lease by the government of Puerto Rico to operate and manage the airport for 40 years beginning in 2013. SJU is the second international airport to be privatized in the United States or its territories, and, as of 2013, is the only currently privatized airport in the nation. Taxis and rental cars can transport travelers to and from the airport. The airport serves as a gateway to the Caribbean islands. SJU covers 1,600 acres (647 ha) of land.

History

In 1945, aware of the importance of aviation for the development of the economy of Puerto Rico, the island government had pointed out the need to build a newer international airport capable of handling the growing air traffic of San Juan International Airport, in Isla Grande, that had been operating since 1929; as well as responding to the needs of the future. Until then Isla Grande had been the main airport of Puerto Rico. As airlines began switching from propeller aircraft to jets, the  Isla Grande airstrip did not have the necessary distance for modern aircraft to land and take off.

On the other hand, the government had also decided that it should direct the air operations, relying these powers in the Puerto Rico Transportation Authority, created in 1942, which later became the Ports Authority. The Committee of Airports of the Planning Board began to study the feasibility of the new airport, submitting in 1944 its plans and studies to the Federal Civil Aeronautics Administration, to determine the most appropriate place.

In 1945, it was determined that the place would be Isla Verde (Carolina), to make the airport a metropolitan facility. Construction was approved by the Puerto Rico Planning Board in 1946, and the project began in 1947. During that same year, the Port Authority of Puerto Rico assumed title to and ownership of the Isla Grande Airport and other regional airports, which had been military installations during World War II.

The design of the new airport was carried out by the firm of Toro-Ferrer, founded by the architects Miguel Ferrer (1914–2004), and architect Osvaldo Toro (1914–1995), which were also known for their designs of the Caribe Hilton Hotel and the Supreme Court of Puerto Rico.

During 1949, the first phase of construction of the Isla Verde Airport was completed: cleaning, filling, leveling and drainage of soils. The second phase also began: paving the runway, taxiways, and platforms.

The certified airlines operating in Puerto Rico in 1950 were Pan American World Airways, Eastern Air Lines, Caribbean Atlantic Airlines, British Airways, Iberia, Dominicana Airlines and Flying Tigers Airline. The latter contracted the movement of migrant workers to the United States, with the Insular Department of Labor, transferring some 5,706 workers to different points of that nation, at a cost of $55 per passage.

On May 22, 1955, the Puerto Rico International Airport was inaugurated, built on a  land lot.

Hundreds of people, enthusiastic about the new aerial installation, witnessed the inaugural events presided over by Luis Muñoz Marín. In a part of his eloquent speech, the Governor said: "Impressive is this work in its structure and in its many facilities, but not as impressive as the fact that this center of communications symbolizes the great technical processes that are transforming civilization".

The first year of operations of the new airport produced an upward movement of passengers to 694,199 and a total of 28 million pounds of cargo was handled.

Evolution of the airport
By 1959, major airlines had introduced jets, which significantly reduced flight time and increased flight cruising safety. At the start of operations, the airport had only one runway (8/26), the old control tower on top of the hotel, 3 terminals and a parking lot for 200 cars.

Construction of the second runway (10–28) on the south side began in May 1967. The project was completed in 1974 at an approximate cost of $4.2 million. With the introduction of the 747 aircraft, runway 8–26 was reinforced and widened in 1974, and ten years later it was repaved.

On January 17, 1983, the two-leveled vehicular access system was built at a cost of approximately $9.2 million. This access separates the arrivals and departures of passengers at different levels, to eliminate traffic congestion.

On February 18, 1985, the Governor of Puerto Rico, Rafael Hernández Colón, converted to law the project to Senate Number 1, officially designating the international airport under the name of Luis Muñoz Marín, in honor of the first governor of Puerto Rico elected by the people.

The airport served as a hub for Pan Am, Trans Caribbean Airways, Eastern Air Lines, and for a short period a focus city for TWA. It was also the center for Puerto Rico's international airline, Prinair, from 1966 to 1984, when Prinair went bankrupt.

In 1986, American Airlines together with American Eagle established a base in Puerto Rico to compete with Eastern Air Lines. At its peak in 2001, the American hub saw over 60 daily mainline flights, mostly to the mainland, and over 100 daily American Eagle flights, mostly to other Caribbean islands on ATR 72 aircraft.

In the past, the airport has been served by Mexicana de Aviación, Lufthansa, Air France, KLM, Martinair, British Airways, British Caledonian, Virgin Atlantic, Norwegian Air Shuttle, Air Europa, PAWA Dominicana, ACES Colombia, BWIA West Indies Airways, ALM Antillean Airlines, Air Jamaica, Viasa, Aeropostal, Volaris, Surinam Airways,LACSA, Aerolíneas Argentinas, Dominicana De Aviación, Wardair, Allegiant Air, ATA Airlines, Northwest Airlines, Continental Airlines, National Airlines (N8), AirTran Airways, Ladeco, Aeronaves de Puerto Rico, Coral Air, Aero Virgin Islands and US Airways.

With the expansion of Eastern Airlines and American Airlines facilities, turning Puerto Rico into their Caribbean hub, the historic figure of eight million passengers at the end of 1988. That same year, an investment in expansion and remodeling of $137 million was announced.

The 1990s marked the beginning of important projects to modernize and expand the facilities and services of the airport in response to the boom in passenger and cargo movement and growth projections.

In the period from 1990 to 2000, several infrastructure works were carried out with an investment of approximately $128 million. Some of these include the expansion of the two-level access road to a maximum of 10 lanes on both levels, the new air traffic control tower (designed by Segundo Cardona FAIA of SCF Architects), a parallel taxiway connecting lanes 8 and 10, a parking garage, and the first and second phase of the Terminal B expansion, modification, and rehabilitation project.

In subsequent years, from 2000 to 2005, other major projects were initiated and completed such as the third phase of the rehabilitation, modification and expansion of Terminal B and the new B / C connector at a cost of $35.9 million, the construction of a new building for the Air Rescue unit at a cost of $4.1 million, and remodeling the hotel at a cost of $5 million.

Competition from low-cost carriers, together with the financial crisis and oil price shock of 2008, led American to reduce its San Juan operation and consolidate its Caribbean hub flying at Miami. American eventually closed its San Juan base and retired its ATR fleet in 2013 as part of its Chapter 11 restructuring. That same year, the airport received major upgrades, including the new Terminal A, new pavement and expansions, new light systems, press conference rooms, consolidated security area for Terminals B, C and D as well as new fast food restaurants along its corridors. In 2012, the new Terminal A was opened, which is currently occupied by JetBlue Airways.

The Airport is owned by the Ports Authority but since 2013 it is managed by Aerostar Airport Holdings, in a private public initiative through which a contract was granted to that company to operate the airport for 40 years. This was after observations were made by politicians in and outside of Puerto Rico, and comments were made that privatization was a better solution for the airport. Prior to privatization, management was changed each time a different political party in Puerto Rico took office and this caused disruption, and a lack of a long-term vision for the airport.

Operations

Luis Muñoz Marín International Airport is Puerto Rico's main international gateway and its main connection to the mainland United States. Domestic flights fly between Carolina and other local destinations, including Culebra, Mayagüez and Vieques. The airport is accessed from the San Juan district of Hato Rey, the island's financial district, via the Teodoro Moscoso Bridge. Old San Juan is accessed via the Baldorioty de Castro Expressway (PR-26). 
The airport serves as the Caribbean hub for Cape Air, Air Sunshine, and Seaborne Airlines, and an operating base for JetBlue. JetBlue is the largest carrier in San Juan, with 51 daily flights on an average day.

Terminals
As of August 2020, Luis Muñoz Marín Airport has one main terminal building with four concourses and a separate terminal with one concourse. However, all terminals are connected. Over the years, the airport has switched between letter designations and number designations. In the late 2010s, the airport incorporated both letter and numbers. The letters are used for the concourses and the numbers used for the airlines' departure areas in Terminals B, C and D, Terminal A having its own ticketing area.

Terminal A
In June 2012, Terminal A was opened and occupied solely by JetBlue Airways, making San Juan a focus city. The terminal originally had seven gates but an additional gate was added for regional airlines during the renovations of Terminals B and C.

As of September 2022, JetBlue uses all gates at Terminal A. Gates A1 and A2 have been used by other airlines in the past such as Copa Airlines and Allegiant Air. Seaborne Airlines and Silver Airways had temporarily moved their operations to Terminal A from Terminal D as renovations and partial reopening took place. All JetBlue flights, both domestic and international, depart from Terminal A.

Terminal A also houses The Lounge San Juan, a VIP airport lounge belonging to Priority Pass as well as Gates A1 through A8.

Terminal B (Concourse)
When Terminal B was closed for renovations, airlines were temporarily moved to Terminals A, C and D. Terminal B reopened after a $130 million renovation in December 2014, with Delta, United, Southwest, and Spirit as its first tenants (with all operations moved in February 2015).

As of September 2022, Terminal B is also used by Air Canada. All check-in counters for airlines using gates in Terminals B, C and D are all located within the Terminal and Gates B2 through B10 are located within the Concourse.

Terminal C (Concourse)
Terminal C reopened from its $55 million renovation in March 2016. The letter designation for Terminal C was temporarily discontinued, and the concourse was instead added as an extension to Terminal B. The Terminal B extension was later changed back to Terminal C.

Both Terminals B and C feature high-end retail stores and new restaurants, improved seating as well as automated baggage scanners currently used only by six other airports in the mainland U.S.

An Avianca VIP airport lounge is located at the entrance of Terminal C. This All-Inclusive lounge is operated by Global Lounge Network.

As of September 2022, Terminal C houses gates C2 through C10 and is used by American, Avianca, Copa, Frontier, Iberia, and international JetBlue arrivals.

Terminal D (Concourse)

The current Terminal D occupies what were formerly known as Terminals D and E and they were previously occupied solely by American Airlines, its regional affiliate, Executive Airlines, which operated flights under the American Eagle brand, and later both British Airways and Iberia. American Airlines' Admirals Lounge continued to operate until March 22, 2014. The former Terminal E area became unused after American Airlines moved their operations to Terminal C in 2015. The American Eagle flights were moved to the previous Terminal D in the late 2000s before being discontinued in April 2013.

Terminal D reopened completely in March 14, 2023 and is mostly used for small and regional aircraft operators such as Air Antilles, Cape Air, InterCaribbean Airways, Silver Airways as well as other carriers. The terminal counts with five gates set up for regional flights and another three gates set up for high-capacity flights. The new terminal has a more open ambience which will be used as a basis for future renovations at Terminals A, B and C. The cost of renovations is estimated to be at around $14 million.

Airlines and destinations

Passenger

Cargo

Statistics

Traffic statistics

Top destinations

Military
 United States Air Force
 Air National Guard
 Puerto Rico Air National Guard
 Muñiz ANGB
 156th Wing

Accidents and incidents
 On March 5, 1969, Prinair Flight 277, a de Havilland Heron from St. Thomas, United States Virgin Islands, was attempting to land at the airport when it crashed into mountainous terrain near Luquillo, killing all 19 on board. An NTSB investigation found that an air traffic controller at the airport mistakenly thought the aircraft was near San Juan when it actually was near Fajardo instead. 
 On December 31, 1972, baseball star Roberto Clemente and his companions died when their DC-7 crashed soon after takeoff from Isla Verde during a relief flight bound for Nicaragua. Neither the bodies of the victims (except for the pilot's) nor the plane's wreckage was ever found.
 On September 26, 1978, an Air Caribbean airlines Beechcraft D185 passenger airplane was landing from Rafael Hernandez Airport in Aguadilla, after a domestic flight, when it crashed into Barrio Obrero, near Residencial Las Casas, killing all 6 on board. The plane fell on top of a bar, injuring several bar clients, including mechanic Luciano Rivera. Wake turbulence from an Eastern Airlines L-1011 which was also landing was found to be the accident's main cause.
 On June 27, 1985, an American Airlines DC-10-10 registered N129AA operating Flight 633 to Dallas/Fort Worth International Airport with 257 passengers on board aborted take-off from runway 8 after a loud rumbling sound was heard by the crew as the airplane approached V1.  Unable to stop the aircraft on the runway, the aircraft ended up nose-first in the lagoon at the end of the runway. A nose gear tire blowout was suspected.  There were no fatalities, and aircraft returned to service six months later.
 On July 22, 1986, a Borinquen Air Douglas C-53D registered N27PR crashed into a lagoon on approach. The aircraft was on a cargo flight to Golden Rock Airport, Saint Kitts and Nevis, when the starboard engine failed shortly after take-off and the crew decided to return to Carolina. One of the two crew members was killed, the other was seriously injured.
 On March 1, 1989, a Borinquen Air Douglas C-49J registered N28PR ditched on approach following a failure of the port engine. Although the landing gear was retracted, the crew did not feather the propeller. This resulted in increased drag which made flight impossible. The aircraft was on an international cargo flight from Golden Rock Airport, Saint Kitts and Nevis.
 On September 17, 1989, a Tol Air Services Douglas C-47A registered N100DW was damaged beyond economic repair by Hurricane Hugo.
 On May 11, 1997, a British Airways DC-10-30, G-NIUK, operated by Flying Colours Airlines, Flight 4508 (BA4508), operating as a Title 14 CFR Part 129, scheduled flight to Gatwick Airport, was evacuated via the slides after the No. 3 (right) engine caught fire at the San Juan International Airport. Visual meteorological conditions prevailed and an IFR flight plan was filed. The airplane was not damaged. The flightcrew of 3, cabin crew of 11, and 248 passengers were not injured. One passenger was seriously injured during the evacuation.
 On July 9, 1998, an American Airlines Airbus A300B4-605R registered N80057 operating flight 574 had a fire in the No. 1 engine shortly after takeoff from Luis Munoz Marin International Airport. The airplane sustained minor damage. The captain, first officer, 7 flight attendants, and 215 passengers were not injured. Twenty-eight passengers reported minor injuries during the post-landing emergency evacuation.
 On September 24, 1998, a Trans-Florida Airlines Convair 240-13 registered N91237 had an engine problem on take-off. It attempted to return to the airport, but lost altitude and was forced to land in a lagoon. Though the aircraft was written off, the two crew and one passenger were uninjured.
 On April 4, 2001, a Roblex Aviation Douglas DC-3A registered N19BA ditched in the ocean after suffering a double engine failure while on a local training flight. Both crew members escaped. The aircraft sustained minor damage.
 On May 9, 2004, an American Eagle ATR 72 operating flight 5401 crashed in San Juan, Puerto Rico after the captain lost control of the aircraft while landing. Seventeen people were injured, but there were no fatalities.
 On March 15, 2012, a Jet One Express cargo Convair 440 operating a flight to St. Maarten crashed near the airport, killing its two occupants. The plane went down in a lagoon after the pilot reported engine trouble.
 On December 2, 2013, an IBC Airways Swearingen SA227-AC Metro III registered N831BC crashed into a terrain near La Alianza, Arecibo, Puerto Rico. The aircraft was on a cargo flight from Santo Domingo, Dominican Republic, when the crew lost control of the aircraft for reasons that could not be determined. Both crew members were killed.
 On August 9, 2014, a JetBlue Airbus A321 operating flight 704 to JFK International Airport, New York had to abort takeoff after one of the engines caught fire. All 186 passengers were evacuated from the aircraft. Two women were slightly hurt during evacuation.
 On June 3, 2017, a fatal crash happened at nearby Pinones Beach when an Air America Airlines airplane, on its way from San Juan to Culebra, tried to perform an emergency landing at the airport, going into the beach's waters instead. A 15-year-old female died, while a 14-year-old female, a 45-year-old male passenger and the aircraft's male pilot were rescued injured but alive.
 On September 22, 2021, a passenger onboard Jetblue flight 261 arriving from Boston attempted to enter the cockpit after choking a crew member with his own tie. The passenger tried to make a call but failed, proceeded to run towards the front galley, demanding in Spanish to be shot before attempting to enter the cockpit when the First Officer opened the door. The passenger was restrained.

In popular culture
 Various scenes of the 1976 La Pandilla teen comedy musical, "La Pandilla en Apuros", were filmed at the airport.
 The airport is featured in Hunter S. Thompson's novel The Rum Diary.
 In the 1984 movie Conexión Caribe, music group Los Chicos arrived at the Luis Muñoz Marín International Airport and boarded an Oceanair airplane.
 Music group Menudo recorded a music video for their song "Claridad", in 1981 at the nearby Isla Verde Beach in Piñones. An Eastern Airlines Lockheed L-1011 aircraft is seen landing at Luis Muñoz Marín International Airport in the video.
 The airport is seen in several scenes of the 2007 action film Illegal Tender, where a Puerto Rican youngster flies to the Island from the mainland United States several times.
 Entering the end of 2021, this airport was prepared to welcome the Miss World 2021 contestants where the grand event was held on March 17, 2022. San Juan was selected to host the 70th Miss World pageant.

See also

 Mercedita International Airport
 Rafael Hernandez Airport
 Transportation in Puerto Rico
 List of airports in Puerto Rico
 List of the busiest airports in the Caribbean

References

External links

 OpenStreetMap - Luis Muñoz Marín International Airport
 SkyVector - Luis Munoz Marin International Airport
 Official website 
 
 

Airports established in 1955
Airports in Puerto Rico
Carolina, Puerto Rico
1955 establishments in Puerto Rico
Economic history of Puerto Rico
Transportation in San Juan, Puerto Rico